Sodium-coupled neutral amino acid transporter 2 is a protein that in humans is encoded by the SLC38A2 gene.

See also
 Solute carrier family

References

Further reading

Solute carrier family